Fuscapex talismani is a species of medium-sized sea snail, a marine gastropod mollusk in the family Eulimidae.

Description
The length of the shell attains 5 mm.

Distribution
This species occurs in the following locations:
 European waters (ERMS scope): in the Atlantic Ocean, west off Brittany, France.

References

External links
 To World Register of Marine Species
 Bouchet, P. & Warén, A. (1986). Revision of the Northeast Atlantic bathyal and abyssal Aclididae Eulimidae, Epitonidae (Mollusca, Gastropoda). Bollettino Malacologico. suppl. 2: 297-576

Eulimidae
Gastropods described in 1986